Broadway, until 1890 Fort Street, is a thoroughfare in Los Angeles County, California, United States. The portion of Broadway from 3rd to 9th streets, in the Historic Core of Downtown Los Angeles, was the city's main commercial street from the 1910s until World War II, and is the location of the Broadway Theater and Commercial District, the first and largest historic theater district listed on the National Register of Historic Places (NRHP). With twelve movie palaces located along a six-block stretch of Broadway, it is the only large concentration of movie palaces left in the United States.

Route
South Broadway's southern terminus is Main Street just north of the San Diego Freeway (I-405) in Carson. Crossing 3rd Street, Broadway passes through the Civic Center including Grand Park. After crossing the US-101 (Santa Ana Freeway), signs read "North Broadway" as it enters Chinatown. It then curves northeast, passing through old railyards, crosses the Golden State Fwy. (I-5) and heads due east to its terminus at Mission Road in Lincoln Heights.

History

Founding and extension
Broadway, one of the oldest streets in the city, was laid out as part of the 1849 plan of Los Angeles made by Lieutenant Edward Ord and named Fort Street. Fort Street began at the south side of Fort Moore Hill (a block north of Temple Street) at Sand Street (later California Street).

In 1890, the name of Fort Street, from 1st Street to 10th Street, was changed to Broadway. The rest of Fort Street, from California Street to 1st Street, was changed to North Broadway.

Proposal for opening Broadway through to Buena Vista Street (now North Broadway), and extending the street south into what was then part of Main Street, below Tenth Street, in order to give a continuous, wide thoroughfare from the southern city limits to the Eastside, was made as early as February 1891.

The Broadway Tunnel under Fort Moore Hill was opened in 1901, extending North Broadway to Buena Vista Street at Bellevue Avenue (later Sunset Boulevard, now Cesar Chavez Avenue). A section of Broadway in South Los Angeles was originally named Moneta Avenue until 1923.

In 1909, construction on a bridge across the Los Angeles River was begun to connect Buena Vista Street to Downey Avenue, which ran from the river to Mission Road. The names of Buena Vista and Downey were then changed to North Broadway, but not without significant objections from affected residents and landowners. The bridge, which continued to be referred to as the Buena Vista Street Bridge for a good while, was opened to traffic in late September 1911.

Los Angeles' central commercial and entertainment street

For more than 50 years, Broadway from 1st Street to Olympic Boulevard was the main commercial street of Los Angeles, and one of its premier theater and movie palace districts as well. It contains a vast number of historic buildings and is listed on the National Register of Historic Places.

Prior to the turn of the 20th century, the city's Central Business District was further north, along Spring and Main streets between the Plaza and 2nd Street. In 1895 J.W. Robinson's opened what was then considered a very large and impressive four-story department store at 239 S. Broadway, signaling of the shift over the next decade and a half of the main shopping district to Broadway below 2nd Street.

Retail hub

From around 1905 through the 1950s, Broadway was considered the center of the city, where residents went to ornate movie palaces and live theaters, and shopped at major department stores and shops. See the Table of department stores on Broadway and Seventh streets below.

Among dozens of significant buildings from that era are the Bradbury Building, Ace Hotel Los Angeles, and the Los Angeles Examiner building designed by Julia Morgan.

Some of the movie theaters on the street fell into disuse and disrepair, some were replaced with parking lots, but many have been repurposed and/or restored. The department stores closed in the 1970s and 1980s, but Broadway has been the premier shopping destination for working class Latinos for decades.

Theater District
NRHP refers to the district as the Broadway Theater and Commercial District, while the City of Los Angeles Planning Department refers to the Broadway Theater and Entertainment District.

Highest concentration of movie palaces in the world
Stretching for six blocks from Third to Ninth Streets, the district includes 12 movie theaters built between 1910 and 1931. By 1931, the district had the highest concentration of cinemas in the world, with seating capacity for more than 15,000 patrons. Broadway was the hub of L.A.'s entertainment scene – a place where "screen goddesses and guys in fedoras rubbed elbows with Army nurses and aircraft pioneers." In 2006, the Los Angeles Times wrote:"There was a time, long ago, when the streets of downtown Los Angeles were awash in neon—thanks to a confluence of movie theaters the world had never seen before. Dozens of theaters screened Hollywood's latest fare, played host to star-studded premieres and were filled nightly with thousands of moviegoers. In those days, before World War II, downtown L.A. was the movie capital of the world."

Columnist Jack Smith called it "the only large concentration of vintage movie theaters left in America." Smith recalled growing up a mile from Broadway and spending his Saturdays in the theaters:"I remember walking into those opulent interiors, surrounded by the glory of the Renaissance, or the age of Baroque, and spending two or three hours in the dream world of the movies. When I came out again the sky blazed; the heat bounced off the sidewalk, traffic sounds filled the street, I was back in the hard reality of the Depression.

Because Broadway has been used as a filming location for decades, many of these theatre marquees can be seen in classic Hollywood films, including Safety Last! (1923), D.O.A. (1950), The Omega Man (1971), Blade Runner (1982), and The Artist (2011).

Revitalization by Spanish-language cinema
In the years after World War II, the district began to decline, as first-run movie-goers shifted to the movie palaces in Hollywood, in Westwood Village, and later to suburban multiplexes. After World War II, as Anglo moviegoers moved to the suburbs, many of the Broadway movie palaces became venues for Spanish-language movies and variety shows. In 1988, the Los Angeles Times noted that, without the Hispanic community, "Broadway would be dead." Jack Smith wrote that Broadway had been "rescued and revitalized" by "the Latino renaissance."

Preservation and renovation efforts
The district has been the subject of preservation and restoration efforts since the 1980s. In 1987, the Los Angeles Conservancy started a program called "Last Remaining Seats" in which the old movie palaces were opened each summer to show classic Hollywood movies. In 1994, the Conservancy's associate director, Gregg Davidson, noted: "When we started this, the naysayers said no one will go downtown to an old theater to see an old movie in the middle of the summer, but we get a number of people who have never seen a movie in a theater with a balcony. The older people (go) for nostalgia. And the movie people—seeing a classic film on a big screen is a different experience." After attending a Conservancy screening, one writer noted: "The other night I went to the movies and was transported to a world of powdered wigs and hoop skirts, a rococo fantasy of gilded cherubs and crystal chandeliers. And then the film started."

Despite preservation efforts, many of the theaters have been converted to other uses, including flea markets and churches. The Broadway movie palaces fell victim to a number of circumstances, including changing demographics and tastes, a downtown location that was perceived as dangerous at night, and high maintenance costs for aging facilities. With the closure of the State Theater in 1998, the Orpheum and the Palace were the only two still screening films.

In 2006, the Los Angeles Times wrote: "Of all of L.A.'s many hidden gems, maybe none is as sparkling nor as hidden as the Broadway theater district downtown." Bemoaning the possible loss of such gems, the same writer noted: "L.A. gave birth to the movies. To lose the astonishing nurseries where the medium grew up would be tragic."

Broadway since 2008
In 2008, the City of Los Angeles launched a $40-million campaign to revitalize the Broadway district, known as the "Bringing Back Broadway" campaign. Some Latino merchants in the district expressed concern that the campaign was an effort to spread the largely Anglo gentrification taking hold in other parts of downtown to an area that has become the city's leading Latino shopping district. A worker at one of the district's bridal shops noted, "On one side, I like the idea. The only thing is that I don't think they want our types of businesses."

The Downtown's real estate revitalization, using the City's adaptive reuse ordinance that makes it easier for developers to convert outmoded and/or vacant office and commercial buildings into residential buildings, has reached the Broadway Historic District. It includes the transformation of the United Artists Theater office tower into the Ace Hotel Los Angeles, and restoration of its movie palace.

The Bringing Back Broadway commission is working on further reviving the landmark Los Angeles boulevard in the historic district. Led by City Councilman Jose Huizar, the commission has recommended widening sidewalks, eliminating traffic lanes, constructing new parking structures, and bringing back streetcar service reminiscent of the street's past. A pedestrian-friendly project finished up in December 2014 that widened the sidewalks and replaced the parking lane with planters, chairs and round cafe tables with bright-red umbrellas. The Great Streets Initiative seeks to bolster the street-level health of the city by making several dozen boulevards more hospitable to pedestrians, cyclists and small businesses. Mayor Eric Garcetti said the effort represents "a shift from the way that our neighborhoods have been planned in Los Angeles," with a new focus on "walkability and transit."

Broadway retail is transitioning from a broad mix of stores catering to Hispanic immigrants and a burgeoning sneaker and streetwear retail cluster has emerged from 4th to 9th streets: Sneaker Row.

Retail in and around the Eastern Columbia, located at the intersection of 9th Street & Broadway, has proliferated in recent years with the opening of Acne Studios, Oak NYC, Aesop, Tanner Goods, BNKR, Austere, A.P.C., and Urban Outfitters located in the Rialto Theater (Los Angeles Historic-Cultural Monument No. 472).

Buildings and sites

All landmarks in geographic order, north to south:

North of Hollywood Freeway

 Little Joe's (razed), 904 N. Broadway, Chinatown
 Site of Broadway Tunnel (1901–1941, demolished) below Fort Moore Hill (leveled), between today's Temple St. and César Chávez Bl.

Hollywood Freeway to Temple

This area south to Second Street is now the Civic Center, as well as the site of the Central Business District during the 1880s and 1890s)
 L. A. County Hall of Justice (1925)

Third to Fourth
South of the intersection of Third and Broadway, sites of interest include:

West side

 #317: Homer Laughlin Building (1896, John Parkinson), 317 S. Broadway, home to Grand Central Market since 1917. Previously home to department stores: Coulter's (1898–1905) and Ville de Paris (1905–1917).
 Former J. R. Lane Dry Goods store, 327–329 S. Broadway, (successors to Crandall and Lane) located here through the 1910s. Later, this was the location of Field's jewelry store and the Broadway food market. Still standing, now a food court, but top floors were removed; now single story only.
 #331–5: Former Jacoby Bros. department store, 331–3–5 S. Broadway, from 1900 to 1935. At  over four floors plus a basement, it was stated at its opening in 1900 that it had the largest selection of clothing and of shoes in the Western United States. Architect John B. Parkinson. The building was home to an independent "Boston Store" department store in the late 1930s; no relation to J.W. Robinson's or the later regional chain by the same name. Currently independent retail. 2 of 4 floors were removed. Replaced the First Methodist Episcopalian Church previously located here, which moved to the northeast corner of 6th & Hill. Still standing, but top floors were removed; two floors remain.
 #337–9: former Haggarty's department store from 1905 to 1917.
 #341–3–5: former J. M. Hale department store from 1909 through the 1920s.
 #351: Site of The Wonder, 351 S. Broadway, opened in 1921, was the largest retail silk store in the U.S.

 #355–363: Grant Building (originally called the "Grant Block", 1898, 3 stories, enlarged to 7 stores 1901–2 by John Parkinson, now two stories) at 363 S. Broadway, northwest corner of 4th Street. Once seven stories tall, all but the first two floors have been removed. It was home to the W. E. Cummings shoe store, which had a large shoe on the roof of the building, serving as a landmark, then, from 1908, a Montgomery Bros. jewelry store, one of the most prominent in the city at the time. The building also housed the Philippine Consulate General in Los Angeles from its establishment from 1947 to 1952.

East side
 Blackstone Building (not to be confused with the later Blackstone Department Store building at 901 S. Broadway), 318–322 S. Broadway (1907), housed Blackstone's Department Store from 1907 to 1917, as well as the Los Angeles County Library and the Cozy Theater. Originally 5 stories, now 3.

 Trustee Building (1905, Parkinson and Bergstrom), 340 S. Broadway, home to various retail stores including Columbia Outfitting in the 1920s.

O. T. Johnson Block (1895, Robert Brown Young, 3 stories) All but one floor have been removed.

 O. T. Johnson Building (1902, John Parkinson, Romanesque, 7 stories), 356–364 S. Broadway, NE corner of 4th/Broadway. All but two floors have been removed.

Fourth to Fifth streets

West side
 former The Broadway dept. store, now the Junípero Serra state office bldg., 320 W. 4th St. (SW corner of Broadway)
 former Woolworth's five and dime, 431 S. Broadway

Metropolitan Building, former home of Owl Drug Co., (1914–1934), L.A. Public Library (1913–1926), J. J. Newberry five and dime (1939-1990); 315 W. 5th (NW corner of Broadway)

East side

Perla on Broadway, a modern 35-story condominium tower completed in 2022, 400 S. Broadway
Site of first Thrifty Drug Store (razed), 412 S. Broadway

Judson C. Rives Building (1907, Charles Ronald Aldrich, 10 stories), 424 S. Broadway, currently The Judson
Bumiller Building (1906, Morgan & Walls, 6 stories), 430 S. Broadway, currently the Broadway Lofts

Chester Williams Building (1926, Curlett & Beelman, 12 stories), 215 W. 5th St. (NE corner of Broadway), replaced a Victorian building with Sun Drug Co. and Weigel-Rixon Clothes Shops

Fifth to Sixth streets

West side

Fifth Street Store/Walker's department store bldg. (1927, architect Alexander Curlett), SW corner of 5th, 501 S. Broadway. The store was known by various names: 1905–1909: Steele, Faris, & Walker Co.; 1909–1925: The Fifth Street Store; 1926–1946: Walker's; 1946–1953 Milliron's; 1953–1959: Ohrbach's-Downtown. 

Schulte United Building (1928), 529 S. Broadway

F. & W. Grand Silver Store Building (1931, Walker & Eisen, Art Deco), 537-541 S. Broadway. It has housed F. & W. Grand Silver five and dime from 1931–1934, a National Dollar store (1934), Richman Brothers (1950s), and a Hartfield's department store (1960s).

East side

The Title Guarantee Block (1913, Morgan, Walls and Morgan), 500 S. Broadway, SE corner of 5th, now called the Jewelry Trades Building
Pettebone Building (opened 1905, architect Robert Brown Young), 510-512 S. Broadway
Roxie Theatre (1931, orig. 1,600 seats), 518 S. Broadway – Movie palace – The Roxie was built in 1932—the last of the movie palaces built on Broadway. The Roxie had a seating capacity of 1,600 when it opened and was noted for its Art Deco or Zigzag Moderne style, including its stepped roofline, angular grillwork, chevron ornament, and terrazzo sunburst in the sidewalk. The theater's sleek Streamline Moderne ticket booth was removed when the theater was converted to retail use.
Cameo Theater – (1910, 900 seats), 528 S. Broadway — Nickelodeon – The Cameo opened in 1910 with a seating capacity of 775. Designed by Alfred Rosenheim in a Renaissance Revival style, the Cameo was originally known as Clune's Broadway. Until it closed in 1991, it was the oldest continuously operating movie theater in California. The Cameo has been converted into a swap meet-type market.
Arcade Theater (1910, orig. 1,450 seats), 534 S. Broadway – English-music-hall-style theater – The Arcade opened in 1910 as a vaudeville house that was part of the Pantages vaudeville circuit. The Arcade was designed by Morgan & Walls in the Beaux Arts style with tripartite vertical division of the facade. Theater has been closed since 1992. Currently used as retail space. 
 Broadway Arcade (Spring Arcade Building), 540 S. Broadway
 Silverwoods Building (1920, Walker and Eisen), 556-8 S. Broadway, northeast corner of 6th Street. Housed Silverwoods, a specialty department store for apparel, flagship for a large regional chain. 5 stories.

Sixth to Seventh streets

West side

Southwest corner of Sixth and Broadway
H. Jevne Company Building, 603 S. Broadway, 1906-7, Parkinson & Bergstrom, still standing. H. Jevne & Co. was one of the city's most prominent grocer, and this new location complemented the one on Spring Street. Prior to 1906, the two-story frame Norton Block (of Major John H. Norton) stood on the site.

600 block of Broadway, west side

Next to what is now the Jevne building on the south at 609–619 S. Broadway were several buildings in succession:
The Hotel Palms, a leading hotel of the city, renovated and repurposed in 1906-7 for use as the Central Department Store.
 The New Paris Cloak and Suit Emporium at 609–11 advertised in 1915
 From 1921 or 1922 through 1927, the prominent Myer Siegel clothing store was located in part of the building (#617–619).
Los Angeles Theatre – (1931, 2,000 seats), 615 S. Broadway, Movie Palace – The Los Angeles opened in 1931 for the premiere of Charlie Chaplin's City Lights. It had a seating capacity just short of 2,000. The theater was designed by S. Charles Lee and S. Tilden Norton in the French Baroque style, and was modeled on San Francisco's Fox Theater. The Los Angeles included the latest technological features when it opened, including an electric monitor of available seats, blue neon floor lights, a restaurant, a children's playroom, soundproof crying rooms, smoking room with built-in cigarette lighters, a walnut-paneled lounge with a secondary screen on which a periscope-like system of prisms relayed the film. The ladies' powder room was lined with mirrors and vanities, and the toilet stalls were each done in a different kind of marble and each toilet bowl of a different pastel shade. In 1988, the Los Angeles Times called it "a movie house for the gods, even in its present dusty state". Columnist Jack Smith wrote that the Los Angeles Theater was "palatial beyond the dreams of a prince" with a lobby that suggested "nothing less than the glory of Versailles.". Aerosmith's video for "Jaded" was filmed throughout the theater. It is owned by the Broadway Theatre Group, and continues to be used as a performing arts venue. Current capacity: 1,931.
 former S. H. Kress five and dime, 621-3-5 S. Broadway
St. Vincent's Jewelry Mart, formerly Bullock's dept. store, NW corner of Seventh and Broadway

East side

Walter P. Story Building (1909, Morgan, Walls and Clements, Beaux-Arts) 600-2-4-6-8-10 S. Broadway, SE corner of Sixth and Broadway. Former location of the Mullen & Bluett clothing store.
Desmond's dept. store bldg. (1924, Albert C. Martin, Sr., Beaux-arts and "Spanish", 6 stories), 616 S. Broadway. Desmond's opened its final flagship store here in 1924 and closed it in 1972. In 2018 the building was renovated as office space, a restaurant and a rooftop bar.
Schaber's Cafeteria Building (1928), 620 S. Broadway, currently a Jordan Brand flagship store

Palace Theatre (1911, G. Albert Lansburgh, Italian Renaissance Revival architecture, 2,200 seats originally, 1,068 seats today), 630 S. Broadway,– vaudeville theater and movie palace – The Palace opened in 1911 with a seating capacity of 2,200. It was an Orpheum Circuit (chain) vaudeville theater from 1911 to 1926 and is the oldest remaining Orpheum theater in the United States. The structure was based on a Florentine early Renaissance palazzo. The brick facade includes multi-colored terra-cotta swags and four panels depicting the muses of vaudeville sculpted by Domingo Mora. It is also owned by the Broadway Theatre Group. 

Joseph E. Carr Building (1908-9, Robert Brown Young, architect) 644–646 S. Broadway. Site of Harris & Frank clothing store, its second downtown location, which operated from 1947–1980. 
 Clifton's Cafeteria, 648 S. Broadway

Seventh to Eighth streets

West side

State Theatre (1921, 2,450 seats), 703 S. Broadway, – Vaudeville theater and movie palace – The State opened in 1921 with a seating capacity of 2,450. The theater offered both film and vaudeville when it opened. Judy Garland performed at the theater as part of the Gumm Sisters in 1929. Designed by Charles Weeks and William Day, the 12-story Loew's State is said to be the largest brick-clad structure in Los Angeles. The theater is also noted for the seated Buddha/Billiken figure, as a good luck charm, located in a niche above the proscenium arch. The exterior has an elaborate "silver platter" chased ornamentation above the ground story. In 1998, Metropolitan Theaters stopped showing movies at the State and leased the space to the Universal Church. As of 2015 the State is owned by the Broadway Theatre Group and is leased by the Cathedral of Faith for use as a church.
F.W. Woolworth Building (1920), 719 S. Broadway, currently houses Ross Dress for Less

Isaac Bros. Building, home of Reich and Lièvre “cloak and suit” emporium (women's apparel), 1917-ca. 1927, 739-745 Broadway
Merritt Building (1915), 761 S. Broadway, (NW corner of 8th)

East side

Site of Hotel Lankershim (1905, demolished), 700 S. Broadway (SE corner 7th St.)

Globe Theatre (1913, 1,900 seats) – Legitimate theater – Located at 744 S. Broadway, the Globe opened in 1913 as the Morosco Theatre, with a seating capacity of 782. Built for impresario Oliver Morosco and designed by the architectural firm of Morgan, Walls & Morgan, it was used for full-scale live dramatic theater. It was converted into a movie theater during the Great Depression and later served as a Spanish-language movie theater. The building was converted into a swap meet in 1987. , construction to restore it to use as an entertainment venue is ongoing. The restored marquee was relit June 24, 2014. The Globe is now a multipurpose space for music, theatrical events and films. Current capacity: 2,000.

Eighth to Ninth streets

West side

 May Co. Bldg. (former dept. store), 829 S. Broadway
 Eastern Columbia Building, 849 S. Broadway

East side

Tower Theatre (1927, 900 seats), 802 S. Broadway. The Tower opened in 1927 with a seating capacity of 1,000. It was the first of more than 70 theaters designed by S. Charles Lee, who described the Tower as a "modified French Renaissance" design. It was the first movie theater in Downtown Los Angeles equipped to accommodate talking pictures. In June 2021, after extensive renovation, it reopened as an Apple Store.
Allied Arts Building (1922), 808 S. Broadway, bought by Singer Sewing Machine Company in 1939
Rialto Theatre (1917), 812 S. Broadway, the Rialto opened as Quinn's Rialto, a nickelodeon, in 1917. It was purchased by Sid Grauman in 1919, the year after he opened the Million Dollar Theater. Today the theater is home to an Urban Outfitters store.
Wurlitzer Building (1923, Walker and Eisen), 818 S. Broadway
Platt Building (1927, Walker and Eisen, Gothic Revival architecture), 830 S. Broadway, originally the headquarters of the Platt Music Corporation, and is now one of several Anjac Fashion's office buildings and home of The Broadway Bar.
Orpheum Theatre (1926, G. Albert Lansburgh, 1,976 seats), 842 S. Broadway. The Orpheum opened in 1926 as the fourth Los Angeles home for the Orpheum vaudeville circuit. Architect G. Albert Lansburgh designed the François Premier style interior. The Orpheum has hosted performances by Jack Benny, Eddie Cantor, Sophie Tucker, Will Rogers, Count Basie, Duke Ellington, the Marx Brothers, and Lena Horne. In the 1990s, Tom Hanks used the Orpheum as a substitute for the Orpheum in Pittsburgh for his film That Thing You Do. The Orpheum has also been featured in the Guns N' Roses video, "November Rain," and in the Sean Penn-produced video for Jewel's "You Were Meant for Me". In 2006, the film Dreamgirls was shot at the Orpheum. The television series So You Think You Can Dance and American Idol have used the Orpheum for Los Angeles auditions, and Idol has televised its early elimination rounds from the theater.
Ninth and Broadway Building (1930, architect Claud Beelman), 850 S. Broadway

Ninth to Tenth streets

West side

Blackstone's Department Store building, 901 S. Broadway. Designed by John and Donald Parkinson in 1916, with 1939 a 1st floor facade remodeling by Morgan, Walls & Clements.
Ace Hotel Los Angeles/United Artists Theatre (1927), 921/933 S. Broadway, see below

United Artists Theater

United Artists Theater (now The Theatre at Ace Hotel) – Movie palace – Located at 933 S. Broadway, the United Artists opened in 1927 with a seating capacity of 2,214. It was the showcase for movies from the United Artists group created in 1919 by Charlie Chaplin, Mary Pickford, Douglas Fairbanks and D.W. Griffith. The theater was designed by C. Howard Crane, with Walker & Eisen, in a Gothic style inspired by a church in Segovia, Spain. The columns feature terra cotta capitals carved with film and theater themed grotesques. The interior includes a series of frescoes and murals by the firm of Anthony Heinsbergen. In 1990, the United Artists Theater was restored by Gene Scott's L.A. University Church; Scott called on his television flock to come to Los Angeles to help with the restoration. Scott's famous "Jesus Saves" sign was placed on the back side of the building to avoid interfering with the original facade. In 2013 the upper floors of the building were renovated into a boutique hotel, the Ace Los Angeles; the auditorium has been returned to use as a concert venue and theater.

South of Olympic Boulevard (originally Tenth Street)

West side

Los Angeles Examiner building, SW corner 11th
Athens Park, 124th to El Segundo Blvd.
Site of the Globe Department Store, 51st and Broadway

East side
The Hoxton hotel, 1060 S. Broadway, in the Los Angeles Railway Building (1925, office building, Noerenberg & Johnson, Beaux-Arts architecture)
Proper Hotel, 1100 S. Broadway, (1926, Curlett & Beelman, California Renaissance Revival architecture). The building originally housed the Commercial Club of Southern California, then the Cabrillo Hotel in the early 1940s, the Case Hotel from the late 1940s to the mid-1960s, and a YMCA from 1965 to 2004.

Other surviving theaters adjacent to Broadway
Warner Bros. Downtown Theatre – Vaudeville theater and movie palace – Located at 401 W. 7th St (northwest corner of South Hill and West 7th St). Opening on August 17, 1920, it was originally called the Pantages Theatre, but was renamed Warner Bros. Downtown Theatre in 1930 after the Hollywood Pantages Theatre was opened. The exterior has an imposing domed corner tower, flanked by twin facades on 7th and Hill. Later in the 1960s, it was known as the Warrens Theatre. It currently houses a jewelry store.
Olympic Theatre – Movie palace – Located at 313 W. 8th St, half a block from S. Broadway, it originally opened in 1927 as Bard's 8th Street Theatre, converted from a restaurant. For a time, it had a second entrance on Broadway. After a period as a chandelier store, COS, a higher-end brand of H&M, began remodeling the store in 2016.
Mayan Theater – Vaudeville theater and movie palace – Located at 1014 South Hill Street. Opened in August 1927 and now designated a Historic Cultural Monument, the Mayan is currently used as a nightclub. Current capacity: 1,491
Belasco Theatre – Legitimate theater – Located at 1050 South Hill Street, adjacent to the Mayan. Built by the Belasco brothers, and designed by Morgan, Walls and Clements. It served as a church from 1950 to 1987, renovations were completed in 2011 to modernize the sound and lighting systems. Currently hosts services for the Los Angeles campus of Hillsong Church. Current capacity: 1,601.

Street grid

South of Third Street

Table of former department stores on Broadway and 7th streets

Public transportation
LA Metro's Historic Broadway station is an under-construction underground light rail station near the intersection of 2nd and Broadway, part of the new Regional Connector tunnel extending light rail lines that currently terminate at 7th Street/Metro Center station, to Union Station. In the new scheme that LA Metro will adopt when the Connector opens, trains will run from Historic Broadway Station on the E Line east to East Los Angeles and west to Santa Monica, and on the A Line northeast to Union Station, Pasadena, and Azusa and south to Long Beach.

Metro J Line bus rapid transit (BRT) has 5 stations adjacent to Broadway in South Los Angeles: 37th Street/USC, Slauson, Manchester/I-110, Harbor Freeway, and Rosecrans. These stations are along the Harbor Transitway, a dedicated busway between Downtown L.A. (Adams Blvd.) and the Harbor Gateway, near Carson, in the median of the Harbor Freeway (I-110), just west of Broadway. J Line BRT runs as far south as San Pedro and as far northeast as El Monte.

Metro Local bus line 45 serves most of the length of Broadway, between Lincoln Heights through Downtown to the Harbor Freeway Station. Local routes 4, 30, and 40 serve portions of Broadway downtown.

See also

Broadway Theater District (Los Angeles)
List of Los Angeles Historic-Cultural Monuments in Downtown Los Angeles
List of Registered Historic Places in Los Angeles
Theater districts in the United States

References

External links

The Broadway Theater Tour
Bringing Back Broadway Plan
Cinema Treasures
USC Geography Department Old Broadway page
You-are-here Broadway Photo Gallery
The Broadway Initiative of the Los Angeles Conservancy

 
Theatres in Los Angeles
Historic districts in Los Angeles
National Register of Historic Places in Los Angeles
Historic districts on the National Register of Historic Places in California
Los Angeles
Streets in Los Angeles
Streets in Los Angeles County, California
Transportation in Los Angeles
History of Los Angeles
Downtown Los Angeles
South Los Angeles
Chinatown, Los Angeles
Carson, California
Former shopping districts and streets in Los Angeles